Lanchkhuti (Lančxutis municip’alit’et’i) is a district of Georgia, in the region of Guria. Its main town is Lanchkhuti.

Lanchkhuti municipality is located in western Georgia, northwest of the Guria Mountains, bordered on the west by an  Black Sea coast. The municipality occupies  of the Kolkheti National Park, the purpose of which is to protect the flora and fauna in the Kolkheti lowlands, as well as to preserve nature intact. At an altitude above sea level, the villages of the lowland zone are mainly bordered by Kolkheti National Park. Most of the municipality is a subtropical zone.

The total land fund of the municipality as of January 1, 2006 is 49860.9 ha, the largest part of which - 76% - is still owned by the state.

Settlements

Politics
Lanchkhuti Municipal Assembly (Georgian: ლანჩხუთის საკრებულო, Lanchkhuti Sakrebulo) is a representative body in Lanchkhuti Municipality, consisting of 27 members and elected every four years. The last election was held in October 2021.

Gallery

See also 
 List of municipalities in Georgia (country)

References

External links 
 Districts of Georgia, Statoids.com

Municipalities of Guria